George E. Van Cott (June 16, 1906 – July 9, 1972) was an American politician who served in the New York State Assembly from 1961 to 1972.

He died on July 9, 1972, in Manhattan, New York City, New York at age 66.

References

1906 births
1972 deaths
Republican Party members of the New York State Assembly
20th-century American politicians